Jagannath Mandir or temple located within the Ujjayanta Palace grounds in Agartala, Tripura, India  is dedicated to the Hindu Gods Jagannath, Balabhadra and Subhadra.

History
Built in the 19th century by then Maharaja of Tripura, Maharaja Radha Kishore Manikya, this temple with an octagonal base has four stories. The temple is adorned with bright orange stepped up Shikharas

See also

References

External links

Agartala Jagannath Temple  - The Divine India

Temples dedicated to Jagannath
Hindu temples in Tripura
Buildings and structures in Agartala